Martin Damm and Cyril Suk were the defending champions, but lost in the semifinals this year.

Jared Palmer and Jeff Tarango won the title, defeating Yevgeny Kafelnikov and Daniel Vacek 6–4, 6–7, 6–2 in the final.

Seeds

Draw

Draw

External links
Draw

Kremlin Cup
Kremlin Cup